Sukuh is a 15th-century Javanese-Hindu temple (candi) that is located in Berjo, Ngargoyoso district, Karanganyar Regency, Central Java, Indonesia on the western slope of Mount Lawu (elevation ).
This temple has a height of 87 meters.
Sukuh temple has a distinctive thematic reliefs from other candi where life before birth and sexual education are its main theme. Its main monument is a simple pyramid structure with reliefs and statues in front of it, including three tortoises with flattened shells and a male figure grasping his penis. A giant 1.82 m (6 ft) high of Shishna with four testes, representing penile incisions, was one of the statues that has been relocated to the National Museum of Indonesia.

Background
Sukuh is one of several temples built on the northwest slopes of Mount Lawu in the 15th century. By this time, Javanese religion and art had diverged from Indian precepts that had been so influential on temples styles during the 8th–10th centuries. This was the last significant area of temple building in Java before the island's courts were converted to Islam in the 16th century. It is difficult for historians to interpret the significance of these antiquities due to the temple's distinctiveness and the lack of records of Javanese ceremonies and beliefs of the era.

The founder of Candi Sukuh thought that the slope of Mount Lawu was a sacred place for worshiping the ancestors and nature spirits and for observance of the fertility cults. The monument was built around 1437, as written as a chronogram date on the western gate, meaning that the area was under the rule of the Majapahit Kingdom during its end (1293–1500). Some archaeologists believe the founder had cast the fall of Majapahit, based on the reliefs that displaying the feud between two aristocratic houses, symbolizing two internal conflicts in the kingdom.

In 1815, Sir Thomas Raffles, the ruler of Java during 1811–1816, visited the temple and found it in bad condition. In his account, many statues had been thrown down on the ground and most of the figures had been decapitated. Raffles also found the giant lingga statue broken into two pieces, which was then glued together. This vandalism of traditional culture (especially where sexuality is not suppressed, as in the statues) is likely to be an effect of the Islamic invasion of Java during the 16th century, based upon the identical patterns found in all other Islamic and monotheistic invasions generally.

Architecture

The central pyramid of the complex sits at the rear of the highest of three terraces. Originally, worshippers would have accessed the complex through a gateway at the western or lowest terrace. To the left of the gate is a carving of a monster eating a man, birds in a tree, and a dog, which is thought to be a chronogram representing 1437 CE, the likely date of the temple's consecration. There is an obvious depiction of sexual intercourse in a relief on the floor at the entrance where it shows a paired lingam which is represented physiologically by the (phallus) and yoni, which is represented bodily by the (vagina). Genitalia are portrayed on several statues from the site, which is unique among Javanese classical monuments.

The main structure of Sukuh temple is like no other ancient edifice; it is a truncated pyramid reminiscent of a Maya monument and surrounded by monoliths and meticulously carved life-sized figures. The Sukuh temple does not follow the Hindu architecture Wastu Vidya because it was built after the Hindu religion had weakened. Temples usually have a rectangular or square shape, but Sukuh temple is a trapezium with three terraces, with one terrace higher than the others. A stone stairway rises through the front side of the pyramid to its summit. It is not known what the monument's unique shape was intended to symbolize. One suggestion is that it represents a mountain. There is no evidence that the main building supported a wooden structure. The only object recovered from its summit was a 1.82-metre lingga statue bearing an inscription and it is now in the National Museum of Indonesia). The statue may once have stood on the platform over the stairway. The lingga statue has a dedicated inscription carved from top to bottom representing a vein followed by a chronogram date equivalent to 1440. The inscription translates "Consecration of the Holy Ganges sudhi in ... the sign of masculinity is the essence of the world." Reliefs of a kris blade, an eight-pointed sun and a crescent moon decorate the statue.

The wall of the main monument has a relief portraying two men forging a weapon in a smithy with a dancing figure of Ganesha, the most important Tantric deity, having a human body and the head of an elephant. In Hindu-Java mythology, the smith is thought to possess not only the skill to alter metals, but also the key to spiritual transcendence. Smiths drew their powers to forge a kris from the god of fire; and a smithy is considered as a shrine. Hindu-Javanese kingship was sometimes legitimated and empowered by the possession of a kris.

The elephant head figure with a crown in the smithy relief depicts Ganesha, the god who removes obstacles in Hinduism. The Ganesha figure, however, differs in some small respects with other usual depictions. Instead of sitting, the Ganesha figure in Candi Sukuh's relief is shown dancing and it has distinctive features including the exposed genitalia, the demonic physiognomy, the strangely awkward dancing posture, the rosary bones on its neck and holding a small animal, probably a dog. The Ganesha relief in Candi Sukuh has a similarity with the Tantric ritual found in the history of Buddhism in Tibet written by Taranatha. The Tantric ritual is associated with several figures, one of whom is described as the "King of Dogs" (Sanskrit: Kukuraja), who taught his disciples by day, and by night performed Ganacakra in a burial ground or charnel ground.

Other statues in Candi Sukuh include a life-sized male figure with his hand grasping his own penis and three flattened shells of tortoises. Two large tortoise statues guard the pyramid entrance and the third one lies at some distance in front of the monument. All of their heads point to the west and their flattened shells may provide altars for purification rituals and ancestor worship. In Hindu mythology, the tortoise symbolizes the base or support of the World and is an avatar of Vishnu, i.e. Kurma refer: Ocean of Milk.

See also

 Pyramid temples in Indonesia
 Candi Kethek, 5 terraces
 Lebak Cibedug, 9 terraces
 Pugung Raharjo, 5 terraces

 In Java
 Candi Ceto
 Candi of Indonesia
 Prambanan Temple, 6th-9th century UNESCO heritage Hindu temple in Central Java.
 Sunda Kingdom, 7th-16th century Indianised Hindu kingdom in Western and Central Java.
 Taruma Kingdom, 2nd-6th century Indianised Hindu kingdom of Western Java. 

 Other related topics 
 Greater India
 Indianisation
 History of Indian influence on Southeast Asia
 Hinduism in Indonesia
 Buddhism in Indonesia
 List of places with columnar jointed volcanics

References

Buildings and structures completed in 1437
1815 archaeological discoveries
Hindu temples in Indonesia
Archaeological sites in Indonesia
Pyramids in Indonesia
Buildings and structures in Java
15th-century Hindu temples
Mount Lawu
Cultural Properties of Indonesia in Central Java
Religious buildings and structures in Central Java